Natekarwada is a prominent landmark at Partawane, Ratnagiri in India. The house was constructed in the year 1910 by Mr.Bhikaji Natekar, who came from his native village, Bambar in Ratnagiri district and started a small hotel in Ratnagiri. This hotel is known today as Sukhdham hotel. He also planted about 400 alphonso mango trees nearby which is now in the vicinity of Ultratech Cement plant, and Finloex colony.

His son Mr. Shantaram ran a dairy business from this place. Today the wife of Late Mr. Shantaram, Padma Natekar, resides in this house along with her nephew Madhav Devasthali and his family.  Madhav is also popularly known as Bandya in Ratnagiri.
He is  a business man having interests in Mango plantations, authorised distributor for number of companies like GE, L&T. He is also actively involved in social activities. 

Mr. Madhav is associated with Patit Pavan Mandir, which was built by Late Vinayak Damodar Savarkar commonly addressed as Veer Savarkar (वीर सावरकर, Brave Savarkar) or Swatantrya Veer Savarkar.  The place must be proudly mentioned as a landmark in the social history of India as it was the first mandir where Dalits and Untouchable at that time were allowed to enter the temple freely.

Buildings and structures in Maharashtra